Khaneh Sar may refer to:
 Khaneh Sar, East Azerbaijan
 Khaneh Sar, Gilan
 Khaneh Sar, Rahimabad, Gilan Province
 Khaneh Sar, Mazandaran